Saleh Mehdi is a Kuwaiti football goalkeeper who played for Kuwait in the 2004 AFC Asian Cup.

References 

Living people
Kuwaiti footballers
Kuwait international footballers
Association football goalkeepers
Footballers at the 2002 Asian Games
1981 births
Asian Games competitors for Kuwait
Al-Sahel SC (Kuwait) players
Kuwait Premier League players
Al-Yarmouk SC (Kuwait) players
Al Tadhamon SC players
Al-Nasr SC (Kuwait) players
Al-Fahaheel FC players
Al-Shabab SC (Kuwait) players
Qadsia SC players
Budapest Honvéd FC players
Expatriate footballers in Hungary
Kuwaiti expatriate sportspeople in Hungary
Kuwaiti expatriate footballers